Bibasis harisa, the orange awlet, is a species of hesperid found in Asia. The butterfly was reassigned to genus Burara by Vane-Wright and de Jong (2003) and is considered by them to be Burara harisa.

Range
The orange awlet is found in India, Myanmar, Malaysia, Java, Singapore, Hong Kong and north Vietnam.

In India, the butterfly is found along the Himalayas from Sikkim to Assam and eastwards to south Myanmar. It also has been recorded from the Andaman islands.

The type locality is Bengal.

Status
It is considered by William Harry Evans to be very rare in Hong Kong, rare in South India, but not rare in the Himalayas.

Description

The butterfly has a wingspan of 45 to 55 mm.

Edward Yerbury Watson (1891) gives a detailed description:

Habits
This butterfly is crepuscular.

Host plants
The larva has been recorded on Zingiber zerumbet (Zingiberaceae).

Cited references

References

Print

Watson, E. Y. (1891) Hesperiidae indicae. Vest and Co. Madras.

Online

Brower, Andrew V. Z. and Warren, Andrew, (2007). Coeliadinae Evans 1937. Version 21 February 2007 (temporary). http://tolweb.org/Coeliadinae/12150/2007.02.21 in The Tree of Life Web Project, http://tolweb.org/

Bibasis
Butterflies of Asia
Butterflies of Singapore
Butterflies described in 1883